"Oh, You Beautiful Doll" is a ragtime love song published in 1911 with words by Seymour Brown and music by Nat D. Ayer. The song was one of the first with a twelve-bar opening.

The tune has been recorded hundreds of times by many artists from first publication until recent times.

Lyrics

Verse 1
 Honey dear, when you're near,
 Just turn out the light and then come over here,
 Nestle close, up to my side,
 My heart's on fire, with love's desire.

 In my arms, rest complete,
 I never thought that life could ever be so sweet,
 'til I met you some time ago,
 But now I know I love you so.

Chorus
Oh! you beautiful doll,
You great big beautiful doll!
Let me put my arms about you,
I could never live without you;

Oh! you beautiful doll,
You great big beautiful doll!
If you ever leave me how my heart will ache,
I want to hug you but I fear you'd break

Oh, oh, oh, oh,
Oh, you beautiful doll!

Second verse
 Precious prize, close your eyes,
 Now we're goin' to visit love's paradise,
 Press your lips again to mine,
 Love is king of ev'ry thing,

 Squeeze me dear, I don't care!
 Hug me just as if you were a grizzly bear,
 This is how I'll go through life,
 No care or strife, when you're my wife.

Notable use in film
As well as being used in the 1949 film of the same name, the tune had been featured in several major movies — The Story of Vernon and Irene Castle (1939), For Me and My Gal (1942), Broadway Rhythm (1944), Strangers on a Train (1951), The Eddie Cantor Story (1953) and The Taming of the Shrew (1969) as well as some Looney Tunes cartoons such as Hair-Raising Hare. The Kidsongs Kids and Billy and Ruby Biggle sang this song with a baby elephant named Belle in their 1995 video and DVD, Baby Animal Songs. The song also appears on the animated series Hey Arnold! where Grandpa Phil sings the song while taking a shower, as well as in the last Fred Astaire variety special, in which he and dance partner Barrie Chase danced to it.  It appears in Somewhere in Time (1980), starring Christopher Reeve and Jane Seymour, during a scene where Reeve and Seymour dance briefly.

Other recordings
 1911 – Billy Murray and The American Quartet recorded the song on September 29, 1911. It was released on Victor 16979.
 1954 – John Serry Sr. and his accordion ensemble for RCA Victor (See "RCA Thesaurus").
 1966 – Nancy Sinatra, covered the song for her 1967 album Sugar.

References

Bibliography
 Ayer, Nat D.; Brown, Seymour. "Oh, You Beautiful Doll" (sheet music). New York: Jerome H. Remick & Co. (1911).

External links
 Recording by Billy Murray and the American Quartet

Rags
1911 songs
Songs with music by Nat Ayer